This is a list of films set on or around Halloween.

Comedy

 Arsenic and Old Lace (1944)
 Boo! A Madea Halloween (2016)
 Boo 2! A Madea Halloween (2017)
 Burying the Ex (2014)
 Dracula: Dead and Loving It (1995)
 Fun Size (2012)
 Gravy (2015)
 Grumpier Old Men (1995)
 The Hollywood Knights (1980)
 How High (2001)
 Hubie Halloween (2020)
 Idle Hands (1999)
 Mean Girls (2004)
 Meet Me In St. Louis (1944)
 Mr. Mom (1983)
 The Midnight Hour (1985)
 Monster Mash (1995)
 Once Bitten (1985)
 Son of the Mask (2005)
 Stan Helsing (2009)
 Wasabi Tuna (2003)
 When We First Met (2018)

Scary Movie franchise
 Scary Movie (2000)
 Scary Movie 2 (2001)
 Scary Movie 3 (2003)
 Scary Movie 4 (2006)
 Scary Movie 5 (2013)

Horror and thriller

 3 from Hell (2019)
 31 (2016)
 All Hallows' Eve (2013)
 The Amityville Horror (1979)
 The Amityville Horror (2005)
 Babysitter Massacre (2013)
 Bad Reputation (2005)
 The Barn (2016)
 Black Pumpkin (2020)
 The Blair Witch Project (1999)
 Boo (2005)
 Boys in the Trees (2016)
 Cemetery of Terror (1985)
 The Changeling (1980)
 The Child (1977)
 C.H.U.D. II: Bud the C.H.U.D. (1989)
 The Clown Murders (1976)
 Clownhouse (1989)
 The Collingswood Story (2006)
 Cry Wolf (2005)
 Dark Night of the Scarecrow (1981)
 Deadly Friend (1986)
 The Devil's Rejects (2005)
 Demonic Toys (1992)
 Donnie Darko (2001)
 The Exorcist (1973)
 Exorcist II: The Heretic (1977)
 Flatliners (1990)
 Flesheater (1988)
 Flick (2008)
 Ginger Snaps (2000)
 Ginger Snaps 2: Unleashed (2004)
 Ginger Snaps Back: The Beginning (2004)
 Girls Against Boys (2012)
 Ghostwatch (1992)
 Grave Halloween (2013)
 The Guest (2014)
 Hack-O-Lantern (1988)
 Halloween Night (2006)
 Halloweenight (2009)
 Haunt (2019)
 Hellbent (2004)
 Hell Fest (2018)
 Hell Fire (2012)
 Hell House LLC (2015)
 Hellions (2015)
 Holidays (2016)
 The Hollow (2004)
 Hollow Gate (1988)
 House II: The Second Story (1987)
 House of 1000 Corpses (2003)
 House of Fears (2007)
 The Houses October Built (2014)
 The Houses October Built 2 (2017)
 I Was a Teenage Werewolf (1957)
 In Search of Lovecraft (2008)
 The Invasion (2007)
 Jack-O (1995)
 The Kiss (1988)
 Lady in White (1988)
 The Legend of Fall Creek (2021)
 The Little Girl Who Lives Down the Lane (1976)
 May (2002)
 The Mean One (2022)
 Mischief Night (2013; Travis Baker)
 Mischief Night (2013; Richard Schenkman)
 Night of the Demons (1988)
 Night of the Demons (2009)
 Murder Party (2007)
 The People Under the Stairs (1991)
 Pet Sematary (1989)
 Pet Sematary Two (1992)
 Poltergeist (1982)
 Poltergeist (2015)
 Poltergeist II: The Other Side (1986)
 Poltergeist III (1988)
 The Predator (2018)
 Primal Rage (1988)
 The Pumpkin Karver (2006)
 The Rage: Carrie 2 (1999)
 The Return of Count Yorga (1971)
 The Return of Dracula (1958)
 Return of the Living Dead: Rave to the Grave (2005)
 Satan's Little Helper (2005)
 The Scarehouse (2014)
 Scary Stories to Tell in the Dark (2019)
 The Silence of the Lambs (1991)
 Silver Bullet (1985)
 Sinister (2012)
 Sleepy Hollow (1999)
 Slugs (1988)
 Scream VI (2023)
 Tales of Halloween (2015)
 Terrifier (2016)
 Terrifier 2 (2022)
 Texas Chainsaw 3D (2013)
 Trick (2019)
 Trick or Treat (1986)
 Trick or Treats (1982)
 Trick 'r Treat (2007)
 Truth or Dare (2012)
 Truth or Dare (2017)
 V/H/S (segment 10/31/98) (2012)
 Volumes of Blood (2015)
 We Need to Talk About Kevin (2011)
 When Michael Calls (1972)
 WNUF Halloween Special (2013)
 Wrong Turn 5: Bloodlines (2012)

Halloween franchise

 Halloween (1978)
 Halloween II  (1981)
 Halloween III: Season of the Witch (1982)
 Halloween 4: The Return of Michael Myers (1988)
 Halloween 5: The Revenge of Michael Myers (1989)
 Halloween: The Curse of Michael Myers (1995)
 Halloween H20: 20 Years Later (1998)
 Halloween: Resurrection (2002)
 Halloween (2007) 
 Halloween II (2009)
 Halloween (2018)
 Halloween Kills (2021)
 Halloween Ends (2022)

Night of the Demons franchise
 Night of the Demons (1988)
 Night of the Demons 2 (1994)
 Night of the Demons 3 (1997)
 Night of the Demons (2009)

Pumpkinhead franchise

 Pumpkinhead (1988)
 Pumpkinhead II: Blood Wings (1994)
 Pumpkinhead: Ashes to Ashes (2006)
 Pumpkinhead: Blood Feud (2007)

Children's and family

 A-Haunting We Will Go (1966) 
 The Adventures of Ichabod and Mr. Toad (1949)
 Alpha and Omega 4: The Legend of the Saw Tooth Cave (2014)
 Alvin and the Chipmunks Meet Frankenstein (1999)
 Alvin and the Chipmunks Meet the Wolfman (2000)
 All Hallows' Eve (2016)
 A Babysitter's Guide to Monster Hunting (2020)
 The Batman vs. Dracula (2005)
 Batman Unlimited: Monster Mayhem (2015)
 Batman: The Long Halloween (2021)
 Bewitched (2005)
 Blackbeard's Ghost (1968)
 Boo to You Too! Winnie the Pooh (1996)
 The Book of Life (2014)
 Bouncing Babies (1929)
 Broom-Stick Bunny (1956)
 Bugs Bunny's Howl-oween Special (1978)
 Casper (1995)
 Casper Meets Wendy (1998)
 Casper's Halloween Special (1979)
 A Cinderella Story (2004)
 Corn on the Cop (1965)
 Corpse Bride (2005)
 Diary of a Wimpy Kid (2010)
 Disney's Halloween Treat (1982)
 Double, Double, Toil and Trouble (1993)
 Ernest Scared Stupid (1991)
 E.T. the Extra-Terrestrial (1982)
 The Flintstones Meet Rockula and Frankenstone (1979)
 Frankenweenie (2012)
 Fright to the Finish (1954)
 Garfield's Halloween Adventure (1985)
 Girl vs. Monster (2012)
 Goosebumps (2015)
 Goosebumps 2: Haunted Halloween (2018)
 Grow Up, Tony Phillips (2013)
 Hallowe'en (1931)
 Halloween Is Grinch Night (1977)
 The Halloween That Almost Wasn't (1979)
 The Halloween Tree (1993)
 Halloween with the New Addams Family (1977)
 Harry Potter and the Philosopher's Stone (2001)
 Hocus Pocus (1993)
 Hocus Pocus 2 (2022)
 The House with a Clock in Its Walls (2018)
 I Downloaded a Ghost (2004)
 Invisible Sister (2015)
 It's the Great Pumpkin, Charlie Brown (1966)
 The Karate Kid (1984)
 Kenny & Company (1976)
 The Legend of Sleepy Hollow (1980)
 Little Ghost (1997)
 Mickey's House of Villains (2002)
 Monster House (2006)
 Monster Island (2017)
 The Monster Squad (1987)
 Monsters vs. Aliens: Mutant Pumpkins from Outer Space (2009)
 Monsters, Inc. (2001)
 Mostly Ghostly (2008)
 Mostly Ghostly: Have You Met My Ghoulfriend? (2014)
 Mostly Ghostly: One Night in Doom House (2016)
 Mr. Magorium's Wonder Emporium (2007)
 Night of the Living Carrots (2011)
 The Nightmare Before Christmas (1993)
 ParaNorman (2012)
 Pooh's Heffalump Halloween Movie (2005)
 Raggedy Ann and Andy in The Pumpkin Who Couldn't Smile (1979)
 Return to Halloweentown (2006)
 R.L. Stine's Monsterville: Cabinet of Souls (2015)
 R.L. Stine's The Haunting Hour: Don't Think About It (2007)
 Room on the Broom (2012)
 Something Wicked This Way Comes (1983)
 Scared Shrekless (2010)
 Scary Godmother: Halloween Spooktakular (2003)
 Scary Godmother: The Revenge of Jimmy (2005)
 The Scream Team (2002)
 The Smurfs: The Legend of Smurfy Hollow (2013)
 Song of the Sea (2014)
 Spaced Invaders (1990)
 Spirit Halloween (2022)
 Spookley the Square Pumpkin (2004)
 Spooky House (2002)
 Spooky Buddies (2011)
 Tom & Jerry Halloween Special (1987)
 Tower of Terror (1997)
 Toy Story of Terror! (2013)
 Trick or Treat (1952)
 Twitches (2005)
 Twitches Too  (2007)
 Under Wraps (1997)
Under Wraps (2021)
Under Wraps 2 (2022)
 When Good Ghouls Go Bad (2001)
 Witch's Night Out (1978)
 The Worst Witch (1986)

Halloweentown franchise
 Halloweentown (1998)
 Halloweentown II: Kalabar's Revenge (2001)
 Halloweentown High (2004)
 Return to Halloweentown (2006)

Hotel Transylvania franchise
 Hotel Transylvania (2012)
 Hotel Transylvania 2 (2015)
 Hotel Transylvania 3: Summer Vacation (2018)
 Hotel Transylvania: Transformania (2022)

The Scooby-Doo animated movie franchise
 Scooby-Doo and the Ghoul School (1988)
 Scooby-Doo! and the Witch's Ghost (1999)
 Scooby-Doo! and the Goblin King (2008)
 Scooby-Doo! and Kiss: Rock and Roll Mystery (2015)
 Happy Halloween, Scooby-Doo! (2020)
 Trick or Treat Scooby-Doo! (2022)

Other

 Affliction (1997)
 American Splendor (2003)
 The Batman (2022)
 Batman Forever (1995)
 Beginners (2010)
 Big Daddy (1999)
 Chemical Hearts (2020)
 Cowboy Bebop: The Movie (2001)
 The Crow (1994)
 Ed Wood (1994)
 E.T. the Extra-Terrestrial (1982)
 Fried Green Tomatoes (1991)
 The Guest (2014)
 The House with a Clock in Its Walls (2018)
 Highball (1997)
 In America (2002)
 Ingrid Goes West  (2017)
 Ironweed (1987)
 Jack the Bear (1993)
 Jack (1996)
 Jack Reacher: Never Go Back (2016)
 Kotch (1971)
 Kramer vs. Kramer (1979)
 Liberty Heights (1999)
 Lost in Translation (2003)
 The Man with a Cloak (1951)
 Meet Me in St. Louis (1944)
 Mischief Night (2006)
 Mysterious Skin (2004)
 Nine Months (1995)
 The Night That Panicked America (1975)
 Nightdreams (1981)
 Ordinary People (1980)
 A Perfect World (1993)
 Practical Magic (1998)
 Showgirls (1995)
 The Skeleton Twins (2014)
 St. Elmo's Fire (1985)
 Sweet Hearts Dance (1988)
 Teenage Mutant Ninja Turtles: Out of the Shadows (2016)
 To Kill a Mockingbird (1962)
 Twin Falls Idaho (1999)
  The Rocky Horror Picture Show (1975)

See also
 Bibliography of Halloween
 Holiday horror
 List of Halloween television specials

External links
 Halloween Feature Films and Videos at the Internet Movie Database
 2021 Schedule of Halloween TV Specials, Shows, and Movies

 
Lists of films set around holidays